This is the discography of American rapper WC.

Albums

Studio albums

Collaboration albums

Mixtapes

Singles

As lead artist

Guest appearances

See also 
 Low Profile discography
 WC and the Maad Circle discography
 Westside Connection discography

References

Hip hop discographies
Discographies of American artists